Sixth Mount Zion Baptist Church is a historic African-American Baptist church located in Richmond, Virginia. The church was founded in 1867. It was listed on the National Register of Historic Places in 1996.

History

background 
The sanctuary was started in 1867 by John Jasper. The church began as a confederate horse stable which was situated on Brown's Island. The church was moved to 14 Duval Street in 1869, and in the 1880s a sanctuary was added by George W. Boyd. 

In 1878 Jasper delivered his controversial "De Sun Do Move" (The Sun Do Move) sermon at the church.

Structure 
It is a two-story, Late Gothic Revival style stuccoed brick structure.  It features a large off-center tower that houses the church bell in belfry and accommodates a large stairwell to the gallery.  Attached to the sanctuary is the two-level Jasper Memorial Education Annex added in 1925.

Expansion 

In 1925, the church was remodeled and extended by an African American architect named Charles Thaddeus Russell.

References

African-American history in Richmond, Virginia
Churches on the National Register of Historic Places in Virginia
Gothic Revival church buildings in Virginia
Churches completed in 1887
19th-century Baptist churches in the United States
Baptist churches in Virginia
Churches in Richmond, Virginia
National Register of Historic Places in Richmond, Virginia